Louis Eugene Tost (June 1, 1911 – February 21, 1967) was a Major League Baseball pitcher. He played three seasons with the Boston Braves (1942–43) and Pittsburgh Pirates (1947).

From 1944 to 1945, Tost served in the United States Navy during World War II.

References

External links

1911 births
1967 deaths
American expatriate baseball players in Canada
United States Navy personnel of World War II
Baseball players from Washington (state)
Boston Braves players
Brandon Greys players
Hollywood Stars players
Indianapolis Indians players
Major League Baseball pitchers
Mission Reds players
Muskogee Tigers players
Oakland Oaks (baseball) players
Pittsburgh Pirates players
Sacramento Senators players
Sacramento Solons players
San Jose Red Sox players
Seattle Rainiers players
Wenatchee Chiefs players
Sportspeople from King County, Washington